How is a town in Oconto County, Wisconsin, United States. The population was 563 at the 2000 census. The unincorporated community of Hayes is located in the town. The town is named for Calvin F. How, Jr., an insurance and banking executive.

Geography
According to the United States Census Bureau, the town has a total area of 35.1 square miles (90.8 km2), of which, 34.9 square miles (90.5 km2) of it is land and 0.1 square miles (0.3 km2) of it (0.34%) is water.

Demographics
As of the census of 2000, there were 563 people, 207 households, and 152 families residing in the town. The population density was 16.1 people per square mile (6.2/km2). There were 229 housing units at an average density of 6.6 per square mile (2.5/km2). The racial makeup of the town was 94.85% White, 4.44% Native American, and 0.71% from two or more races. Hispanic or Latino of any race were 1.07% of the population.

There were 207 households, out of which 32.4% had children under the age of 18 living with them, 68.6% were married couples living together, 2.9% had a female householder with no husband present, and 26.1% were non-families. 22.2% of all households were made up of individuals, and 9.2% had someone living alone who was 65 years of age or older. The average household size was 2.72 and the average family size was 3.24.

In the town, the population was spread out, with 28.4% under the age of 18, 6.2% from 18 to 24, 27.5% from 25 to 44, 24.7% from 45 to 64, and 13.1% who were 65 years of age or older. The median age was 39 years. For every 100 females, there were 114.1 males. For every 100 females age 18 and over, there were 111.0 males.

The median income for a household in the town was $39,167, and the median income for a family was $44,125. Males had a median income of $28,393 versus $20,521 for females. The per capita income for the town was $15,447. About 3.8% of families and 7.7% of the population were below the poverty line, including 13.2% of those under age 18 and 6.8% of those age 65 or over.

References

Towns in Oconto County, Wisconsin
Green Bay metropolitan area
Towns in Wisconsin